New MacDonald's Farm is an Australian children's television program broadcast on the Nine Network, and Playhouse Disney, with episodes being produced from October 11, 2004 until at least October 24, 2008. This show and Australian hit Hi-5 used to swap the timeslot in order to film new seasons.

The show revolves around a farm in the country owned by Milly and Max and occupied by six farm animals: Henry the Horse, Daisy the cow, Dash the Duck, Percy the Pig, Shirley the Sheep, and Charlotte the Hen. The show is aimed at pre-schoolers, and is of a light-hearted nature. It includes short sequences related to the show's plot, and sequences of singing and dancing with Max, Milly and some other children (who are older than pre-school age). Max is a forgetful, funny and energetic farm worker, who often gets his foot stuck in a bucket. Milly, on the other hand, is an intelligent, helpful and caring farmhand, who often helps Max out of his sticky situations. Each episode is half an hour long.

The name of the show suggests that it was inspired by the classic children's song Old McDonald Had a Farm. Which is quite suitable, as it is not exactly what you would call an olden day farm, but the exact opposite, except for the good old windmill.

Format
The farm is tying into the title's name "New McDonald's Farm". The logo (on the entrance to the farm) is a yellow sun with the title name on it (in yellow, blue and orange. A running gag is that whenever the sign falls down, Max is desperate to fix it. The "Song of the Day" segment is after the intro of the show.

Max and Milly are played by 3 Brisbane actors and one actor from Britain, Tim Mager, Nikki Payten, Heidi Luchterhand and John Tobias who wear large foam and fabric costumes with animatronic heads. The controls are very simple and involve servo motors to actuate the eye blink, eye turn and mouth open and close. This is a very basic system, which relies on the character performers off screen to watch and listen to the pre-recorded audio track, and try to sync the mouth movement.

The animals are cable controlled and have limited movement, sometimes requiring the performers to pick them up and physically move them around to create the illusion of life.

Inside their suits, Tim, Nikki, Heidi and John must wear cold vests, which are made of a gel. These are frozen, and then slowly thaw out as the actors wear them. The suits are extremely hot to wear.

After the first season, James Colmer was commissioned to re-design and re-build all the head animatronics, making them lighter, stronger, and easier to maintain. A full kilogram of weight was shaved off, by the use of lightweight aluminium.

For the third season they were re-designed and re-built again, this time by Dan Carlisle. These heads proved to be the most reliable and actor friendly. They required next to no maintenance and were much lighter compared to the heads of the first and second series. The new mechanisms also provided a much greater range of movement.

Production

The series was developed by Simon Hopkinson, Ron Saunders was well known as the creator of Spellbinder and Johnson and Friends and Ian Munro who also directed Hi-5, Bananas in Pyjamas, Johnson and Friends, Magic Mountain, Cushion Kids and Toybox.

Animatronic designer and puppeteer Ian James Colmer, who also plays the voice of Charlotte the Hen, now runs a film production company Destiny Pictures (www.destinypictures.net).

Charlotte the Hen got her name from a competition winner named Charlotte with initial S.

DVD releases

Farmyard Party Time (2004)
Fantastic Farmers (2005)
Fun in the Country (2005)
Play with the animals (2005)
A Farmers Work is Never Done (2005)
Barnyard Boogie (2006)
Max’s Tractor (2006)
Max and Milly’s Country Show (2007)
Animals to the Rescue (2007)
I Can Fix Anything (2007)
Farmyard Friends (2008)

Other Media
The series released two albums in 2004 & 2006, numerous books, live shows and other merchandise.

All songs for the show are provided by a team of writers from Sony/ ATV Music Publishing.  Recording & production of all music is done by Jay Collie, who is also known for his performance, songwriting and production work in the popular country/rock/pop band, Jonah's Road.

References

Australian children's television series
Australian television shows featuring puppetry
Nine Network original programming
2004 Australian television series debuts
2008 Australian television series endings
Television shows set in Brisbane
2000s preschool education television series
Australian preschool education television series
Television series about mammals
Television series by Beyond Television Productions